The 1999 CFL season is considered to be the 46th season in modern-day Canadian football, although it is officially the 42nd Canadian Football League season.

CFL News in 1999

The CFL enters the final season of the 1900s with increased growth in attendance and television ratings after the '98 season.

The '98 season attendance figures showed a 6.1% increase, which surpassed '97 season figures. TSN television ratings grew by 26.6% in the ages 2+ demographic.

The 1998 Grey Cup game viewership increased to 20.5% as 3.06 million viewers watched the Calgary Stampeders defeat the Hamilton Tiger-Cats, 26–24, which surpassed the '97 Grey Cup game.

The 1999 CFL season, along with the 2001 CFL season, would be one of the closest times where an East Division team could have cross over to the West Division for that division's last playoff spot since the introduction of the Cross over in 1997. The Winnipeg Blue Bombers had to only win one more game to go 7–11, to beat the Edmonton Eskimos final standings, both teams finishing with a tie of 6–12 instead, and under the current rule, even if the team in 4th place in the other division has a better season series record (most wins in the match ups between the teams, or most points scored in total in those games), in which case both were tied again and Edmonton still wins the tie with a 75–53 in two games, for a team to cross over it must have a better final standing win record than the 3rd placed team in the other division, so there was no cross over.

Regular season standings

Final regular season standings
Note: GP = Games Played, W = Wins, L = Losses, T = Ties, PF = Points For, PA = Points Against, Pts = Points

Bold text means that they have clinched the playoffs.
BC and Montreal both have first round byes.

Grey Cup playoffs

The Hamilton Tiger-Cats are the 1999 Grey Cup Champions, avenging last season's championship loss to the Calgary Stampeders with a 32–21 victory, at Vancouver's BC Place Stadium.  The Tiger-Cats have won their first championship since the 1986 CFL season. The Tiger-Cats' Danny McManus (QB) was named the Grey Cup's Most Valuable Player and Mike Morreale (SB) was the Grey Cup's Most Valuable Canadian.

Playoff bracket

CFL Leaders
 CFL Passing Leaders
 CFL Rushing Leaders
 CFL Receiving Leaders

1999 CFL All-Stars

Offence
QB – Danny McManus, Hamilton Tiger-Cats
RB – Kelvin Anderson, Calgary Stampeders
RB – Mike Pringle, Montreal Alouettes
SB – Darren Flutie, Hamilton Tiger-Cats
SB – Allen Pitts, Calgary Stampeders
WR – Ben Cahoon, Montreal Alouettes
WR – Travis Moore, Calgary Stampeders
C – Jamie Taras, BC Lions
OG – Leo Groenewegen, Edmonton Eskimos
OG – Pierre Vercheval, Montreal Alouettes
OT – Uzooma Okeke, Montreal Alouettes
OT – Rocco Romano, Calgary Stampeders

Defence
DT – Demetrious Maxie, Toronto Argonauts
DT – Johnny Scott, BC Lions
DE – Daved Benefield, BC Lions
DE – Joe Montford, Hamilton Tiger-Cats
LB – Calvin Tiggle, Hamilton Tiger-Cats
LB – Mike O'Shea, Toronto Argonauts
LB – Maurice Kelly, Winnipeg Blue Bombers
CB – William Hampton, Calgary Stampeders
CB – Adrion Smith, Toronto Argonauts
DB – Gerald Vaughn, Hamilton Tiger-Cats
DB – Barron Miles, Montreal Alouettes
DS – Rob Hitchcock, Hamilton Tiger-Cats

Special teams
P – Noel Prefontaine, Toronto Argonauts
K – Mark McLoughlin, Calgary Stampeders
ST – Jimmy Cunningham, BC Lions

1999 Western All-Stars

Offence
QB – Damon Allen, BC Lions
RB – Kelvin Anderson, Calgary Stampeders
RB – Robert Drummond, BC Lions
SB – Terry Vaughn, Calgary Stampeders
SB – Allen Pitts, Calgary Stampeders
WR – Eddie Brown, BC Lions
WR – Travis Moore, Calgary Stampeders
C – Jamie Taras, BC Lions
OG – Leo Groenewegen, Edmonton Eskimos
OG – Val St. Germain, Edmonton Eskimos
OT – John Terry, Saskatchewan Roughriders
OT – Rocco Romano, Calgary Stampeders

Defence
DT – Doug Petersen, Edmonton Eskimos
DT – Johnny Scott, BC Lions
DE – Daved Benefield, BC Lions
DE – Neil Smith, Saskatchewan Roughriders
LB – Paul Lacoste, BC Lions
LB – Terry Ray, Edmonton Eskimos
LB – Willie Pless, Saskatchewan Roughriders
CB – William Hampton, Calgary Stampeders
CB – Eric Carter, BC Lions
DB – Dale Joseph, BC Lions
DB – Jack Kellogg, Calgary Stampeders
DS – Greg Frers, Calgary Stampeders

Special teams
P – Lui Passaglia, BC Lions
K – Mark McLoughlin, Calgary Stampeders
ST – Jimmy Cunningham, BC Lions

1999 Eastern All-Stars

Offence
QB – Danny McManus, Hamilton Tiger-Cats
RB – Ronald Williams, Hamilton Tiger-Cats
RB – Mike Pringle, Montreal Alouettes
SB – Darren Flutie, Hamilton Tiger-Cats
SB – Milt Stegall, Winnipeg Blue Bombers
WR – Ben Cahoon, Montreal Alouettes
WR – Robert Gordon, Winnipeg Blue Bombers
C – Carl Coulter, Hamilton Tiger-Cats
OG – Chris Burns, Hamilton Tiger-Cats
OG – Pierre Vercheval, Montreal Alouettes
OT – Uzooma Okeke, Montreal Alouettes
OT – Dave Hack, Hamilton Tiger-Cats

Defence
DT – Demetrious Maxie, Toronto Argonauts
DT – Jason Richards, Montreal Alouettes
DE – Elfrid Payton, Montreal Alouettes
DE – Joe Montford, Hamilton Tiger-Cats
LB – Calvin Tiggle, Hamilton Tiger-Cats
LB – Mike O'Shea, Toronto Argonauts
LB – Maurice Kelly, Winnipeg Blue Bombers
CB – Irvin Smith, Montreal Alouettes
CB – Adrion Smith, Toronto Argonauts
DB – Gerald Vaughn, Hamilton Tiger-Cats
DB – Barron Miles, Montreal Alouettes
DS – Rob Hitchcock, Hamilton Tiger-Cats

Special teams
P – Noel Prefontaine, Toronto Argonauts
K – Paul Osbaldiston, Hamilton Tiger-Cats
ST – Wade Miller, Winnipeg Blue Bombers

1999 Intergold CFLPA All-Stars

Offence
QB – Damon Allen, BC Lions
OT – Uzooma Okeke, Montreal Alouettes
OT – Chris Perez, Winnipeg Blue Bombers
OG – Fred Childress, Calgary Stampeders
OG – Val St. Germain, Edmonton Eskimos
C – Jamie Taras, BC Lions
RB – Mike Pringle, Montreal Alouettes
FB – Michael Soles, Montreal Alouettes
SB – Allen Pitts, Calgary Stampeders
SB – Darren Flutie, Hamilton Tiger-Cats
WR – Milt Stegall, Winnipeg Blue Bombers
WR – Travis Moore, Calgary Stampeders

Defence
DE – Joe Montford, Hamilton Tiger-Cats
DE – Elfrid Payton, Montreal Alouettes
DT – Johnny Scott, BC Lions
DT – Ed Philion, Montreal Alouettes
LB – Alondra Johnson, Calgary Stampeders
LB – Darryl Hall, Calgary Stampeders
LB – Mike O'Shea, Toronto Argonauts
CB – Adrion Smith, Toronto Argonauts
CB – Eric Carter, BC Lions
HB – Gerald Vaughn, Hamilton Tiger-Cats
HB – Barron Miles, Montreal Alouettes
S – Lester Smith, Montreal Alouettes

Special teams
K – Mark McLoughlin, Calgary Stampeders
P – Terry Baker, Montreal Alouettes
ST – Jimmy Cunningham, BC Lions

Head coach
 Charlie Taaffe, Montreal Alouettes

1999 CFL Awards
CFL's Most Outstanding Player Award – Danny McManus (QB), Hamilton Tiger-Cats
CFL's Most Outstanding Canadian Award – Mike O'Shea (LB), Toronto Argonauts
CFL's Most Outstanding Defensive Player Award – Calvin Tiggle (LB), Hamilton Tiger-Cats
CFL's Most Outstanding Offensive Lineman Award – Uzooma Okeke (OT), Montreal Alouettes
CFL's Most Outstanding Rookie Award – Paul Lacoste (LB), BC Lions
CFL's Most Outstanding Special Teams Award – Jimmy Cunningham (RB), BC Lions
CFLPA's Outstanding Community Service Award – Jamie Taras (C), BC Lions
CFL's Coach of the Year – Charlie Taaffe, Montreal Alouettes
Commissioner's Award - Fausto Bellomino, Toronto

References

1999
1999 in Canadian football